The Falls of Glomach, in Ross-shire, Scotland, is one of the tallest waterfalls in Britain, with a drop of 113 m (370 ft). The falls border Kintail, donated to the National Trust for Scotland in 1944 and subsequently incorporating West Affric in 1993. It is not easily reached on foot, requiring a 20 kilometre trek through remote and wild countryside.

See also
 List of waterfalls of the United Kingdom

External links

 Walk details at walkhighlands.co.uk
 Details at visithighlands.com
 NTS Kintail

National Trust for Scotland properties
Tourist attractions in Highland (council area)
Environment of Highland (council area)
Glomach